John MacPhail (born 7 December 1955) is a Scottish former footballer who played as a defender.

Career
Born in Dundee, Scotland, MacPhail started out at St Columba BC  before moving to Dundee. From Dundee MacPhail journeyed south to Sheffield United. He stayed at United for five years, making 135 appearances and forming an effective partnership in central defence with Tony Kenworthy.

MacPhail moved on in 1983 and won the York City Clubman of the Year award two seasons running, winning the 1983–84 and 1984–85 awards.
MacPhail left York for Bristol City in July 1986. A year later he was re-united with former boss, Denis Smith at Sunderland.
He captained Sunderland to two promotions as they returned to First Division in 1990. His only top flight appearance was on the opening day of the 1990–91 season. He left Sunderland for Hartlepool United, initially as a player. He was appointed player/manager of Hartlepool on 24 November 1993 and was sacked on 9 September 1994.

References

External links

John MacPhail for Sunderland 'Player of the day'
John MacPhail profile at sporting-heroes.net

1955 births
Living people
Footballers from Dundee
Scottish footballers
Scottish football managers
Association football defenders
Sheffield United F.C. players
York City F.C. players
Bristol City F.C. players
Sunderland A.F.C. players
Hartlepool United F.C. players
English Football League players
Hartlepool United F.C. managers
Dundee F.C. players
English Football League managers
Scottish Football League players